Dipartiella is a genus of marine Eukaryotes from the family Trichodinidae. There are two species, Dipartiella Simplex and Dipartiella Stein, both of which can be found in edible fish.

References

Oligohymenophorea
Ciliate genera